Three ships of the United States Navy have been named USS Santee, after the Santee River of South Carolina.

  was one of the last sailing frigates of the Navy, started in 1820 but not completed until 1855.
  was a freighter, launched as 
  was acquired in 1940 as a fleet oiler, converted to an escort carrier in 1942, and in service until 1946.

United States Navy ship names